The János Esterházy Monument is a monument located in Warsaw's Ursynów at 3 Przy Bażantarni Street, commemorating the Czechoslovak politician of Hungarian origin, János Esterházy.

The monument is a gift from Hungary to Warsaw. The author of the bust is the Hungarian sculptor János Blaskó.

The monument was unveiled on June 15, 2011 in front of The Church of Blessed Ladislas of Gielniów in the presence of, among others of the Speaker of the Hungarian National Assembly, László Kövér.

References

Monuments and memorials in Warsaw
2011 establishments in Poland
2011 sculptures
Outdoor sculptures in Poland